Arkadiusz Reca (born 17 June 1995) is a Polish professional footballer who plays as a left-back for Italian club Spezia. He also represents the Poland national team.

Club career
On 25 September 2020 he joined Crotone on loan.

On 26 August 2021, Spezia announced a signing of a four-year contract with Reca. On 29 August 2021, Atalanta clarified that the transfer is an initial loan with an obligation to buy.

References

External links

Living people
1995 births
People from Chojnice
Association football midfielders
Polish footballers
Poland international footballers
Poland youth international footballers
Poland under-21 international footballers
Polish expatriate footballers
Ekstraklasa players
Serie A players
Chojniczanka Chojnice players
Flota Świnoujście players
Wisła Płock players
Atalanta B.C. players
S.P.A.L. players
F.C. Crotone players
Spezia Calcio players
Expatriate footballers in Italy